The Miss Eswatini is a national beauty pageant in Eswatini. The pageant was named Miss Swaziland beauty pageant and rebranded to be Miss Eswatini Organization in 2018. The pageant winner aims to be a cultural ambassador of her country. Eswatini last competed at Miss Universe 1994 when Nicola Smith, Miss Swaziland 1994 competed for the crown. This year winner is Tania Nunn who crowned on November 28, 2022.

History
Miss Eswatini pageant was held for first time in 1975. The pageant was run by Eswatini Beauty Pageant Association (ESBPA) in Swaziland. The winner of Miss Eswatini has competed at Miss World pageant ever since the inception of the pageant in 1975 with Vinah Mamba as the country's first international representative. Miss Eswatini will be taking pride in its ability to produce and nurture independent and motivated young ladies who will play an important role in our society through their different skills and abilities through this year's Miss Eswatini pageant. Since 2010 Eswatini does not compete at the Miss World, the last candidate is Nompilo Mncina (as Miss Swaziland 2009). In 2017 the Miss Eswatini held for the first time after 3 years left. Eswatini National Arts and Culture (ESNCAC) partnered to the Miss Eswatini committee. Nowadays the winner will take act as goodwill ambassador in the Kingdom of Eswatini and will go to Miss Africa beauty pageant. It's unsure that the kingdom will automatically return at Miss Universe or even Miss World competition.

The new foundation after renaming the country's name, the Miss Eswatini holds mission is to empower and provide opportunities for young, diverse, goal women who have the desire and passion for public service and charity while progressively moving forward in their personal and professional life during their year of service and beyond.

In 2022 the committee planned to get the license of Miss Universe. The winner of Miss Eswatini expected to represent the kingdom at the next edition of Miss Universe.

Ownership
Swaziland Beauty Pageant Association (SBPA) (1975-2018)
Miss Eswatini Organization, Musawenkosi Mantinto directorship (2022-present)

Titleholders

Representatives to international beauty pageants

Miss Universe Eswatini

References

External links
misseswatini.com
missuniverse.com

Recurring events established in 1975
Swazi awards
Annual events in Eswatini
1975 establishments in Swaziland
Eswatini
Eswatini
Women in Eswatini